Devario sondhii is a small, freshwater fish of the family Cyprinidae found in Myanmar.  It is oviparous.

References

External links
 Devario sondhii

Devario
Fish described in 1934